William Jonathon Dennis (born 10 July 2000) is an English professional footballer who plays as a goalkeeper for Slough Town on loan from AFC Bournemouth.

Career
Dennis started his career in the academy of Luton Town before moving to join the Watford academy, where he played from under-9s up to under-16s. After being released by Watford, Dennis had trials with Milton Keynes Dons, Coventry City and Stevenage.

Dennis joined AFC Bournemouth at the age of 15 in 2016, turning professional 18 months later and joining the first-team at the start of the 2019–20 season. He also had spells in non-league with Guernsey and Weymouth during the 2017–18 season.

In March 2020 he signed a new three-and-a-half year contract with the club. Later that month he was praised by manager Eddie Howe.

On 11 December 2021, Dennis signed for Wealdstone on an emergency loan. He made his debut on the same day, in a 1–0 defeat to Halifax On 18 December 2021, Dennis was recalled from his loan spell by parent club AFC Bournemouth.

In January 2023, Dennis joined National League South club Slough Town on loan for the remainder of the season.

Career statistics

References

2000 births
Living people
English footballers
Association football goalkeepers
Luton Town F.C. players
Watford F.C. players
AFC Bournemouth players
Guernsey F.C. players
Weymouth F.C. players
Wealdstone F.C. players
Slough Town F.C. players
Isthmian League players
Southern Football League players
National League (English football) players